Stadensen is a village and former municipality in the district of Uelzen, in Lower Saxony, Germany. Since 1 November 2011 it has been part of the municipality of Wrestedt.

References

Villages in Lower Saxony
Uelzen (district)